Manly Wynne was a state legislator in Alabama. He served in the Alabama House of Representatives from 1874 until 1876.

References

Members of the Alabama House of Representatives
19th-century American politicians

Year of birth missing
Year of death missing